Aigle railway station is a railway station in the municipality of Aigle, in the Swiss canton of Vaud. It is an intermediate stop on the standard gauge Simplon line of Swiss Federal Railways and the terminus of three  gauge lines operated by Transports Publics du Chablais: the Aigle–Leysin, Aigle–Ollon–Monthey–Champéry, and Aigle–Sépey–Diablerets lines.

Services 
 the following services stop at Aigle:

 RegioExpress:
 Regio:

References

External links 
 
 

Railway stations in the canton of Vaud
Swiss Federal Railways stations